The men's individual competition of the Sochi 2014 Olympics was held at Laura Biathlon & Ski Complex on 13 February 2014. The gold medal was won by Martin Fourcade, France, the silver medal by Erik Lesser, Germany and the bronze medal was won by Evgeniy Garanichev, Russia.

Qualification

Countries were assigned quotas using a combination of the Nation Cup scores of their top three athletes in the individual, sprint, and relay competitions at the 2012 World Championships in Ruhpolding, Germany, and the 2013 World Championships in Nové Město na Moravě, Czech Republic. The top 20 nations would be able to start four athletes in the individual competition, while nations 21 through 28 could start one each. Nations below 28 could only start if any nation decided to vacate a quota spot.

During the 2012–13 or 2013–14 Biathlon World Cup season the athlete needed two results at IBU Cup, Open European Championships, World Championships or World Cup in the Sprint or Individual that at a maximum 20% behind the average time of the top three athletes. Or, two placings in the top half at the Junior World Championships. They could also have a combination of both criteria (one of each).

Schedule
All times are (UTC+4).

Results
The race was started at 18:00.

References

Individual